Annenkov Island is to the west of the main island of South Georgia. The Pickersgill Islands are to its southeast.

History
The island was discovered in January 1775 by a British expedition under James Cook, who named it Pickersgills Island for Lieutenant Richard Pickersgill of the expedition ship HMS Resolution. It was rediscovered in 1819 by a Russian expedition under Fabian Gottlieb von Bellingshausen on the Vostok, who, thinking he was the discoverer of the island, named it Annenkov Island for Lieutenant Mikhail Annenkov, officer on the expedition ship. The name Pickersgill has become established for a group of islands  to the southeast—see  Pickersgill Islands.

Discovery Investigations (DI) surveyed the area in the period 1926–30. The  under Harald Horntvedt, visited the area between 1927 and 1928. The island was surveyed by the South Georgia Survey between 1951–1957. Many of its features were named by the United Kingdom Antarctic Place-Names Committee (UK-APC) following these surveys. Others were named following a geological survey by the British Antarctic Survey (BAS), 1972–73.

Geography 
Except where noted, the following features were named by UK-APC.

Annenkov island is a rocky island with a number of ridges and hills, particularly toward the centre. Olstad Peak was named for Norwegian zoologist and expedition member Ola Olstad. An irregular ridge called Bareback Ridge extends north from Olstad Peak. The name stems from the absence of surficial material and vegetation from its top and sides. They were named for Ray McPherson, a British Antarctic Survey (BAS) officer. It was named for BAS geologist Eric Lawther. 

First Point, charted and named by DI, is the northwest point of Annenkov Island. Mislaid Rock, first named on a 1931 British Admiralty chart, lies offshore to the southwest. The name appears to be first used on a 1931 British Admiralty chart.

On the eastern arm of the island is a tussock-covered ridge called Albatross Crest, named for the wandering albatross (Diomedea exulans) which nests here.

It was named for BAS geologist Timothy Pettigrew. 

South West Point marks the southwest point of Annenkov Island, and appears to have been first named on a chart based upon DI surveys undertaken in the period 1926–30. East of this point, Rustad Bay indents the island's southwest coast. It was named for Norwegian biologist Ditlef Rustad. The ship avoided striking the rock in rough weather and low visibility, passing within  of heavy breakers.

The island also contains some named freshwater lakes mapped and named by the British Antarctic Survey in 1972–73. Fan Lake is a small lake located in the southeast of the island. The lake is fed by meltwater and is bounded to the west by an alluvial fan, from which the name is derived.

The island is surrounded by reefs, including Hauge Reef and Low Reef to the east.

Wildlife
A site of special scientific interest, Annenkov always was and remains one of the few rat-free islands of the South Georgia archipelago, and as Bellinghausen lamented, there is "not a single shrub nor any vegetation" on the island. 500 wandering albatross pairs breed here.

See also 
 Composite Antarctic Gazetteer
 History of South Georgia and the South Sandwich Islands
 List of Antarctic islands north of 60° S
 Scientific Committee on Antarctic Research

References

Further reading
 Stonehouse, B (ed.) Encyclopedia of Antarctica and the Southern Oceans (2002)

External links 
 

Islands of South Georgia
Uninhabited islands of South Georgia and the South Sandwich Islands